Daniel Richard Tye (November 9, 1899 – February 27, 1965) was an American Negro league third baseman in the 1930s.

A native of Barbourville, Kentucky, Tye played for the Memphis Red Sox in 1930. He died in Cincinnati, Ohio in 1965 at age 65.

References

External links
 and Seamheads

1899 births
1965 deaths
Memphis Red Sox players
Baseball third basemen
Baseball players from Kentucky
People from Barbourville, Kentucky
20th-century African-American sportspeople